Alpheus ǀGou-ǃna ǃNaruseb (born 20 March 1954) is a Namibian politician who has served in the cabinet of Namibia in various portfolios. A member of the South West Africa People's Organization (SWAPO), !Naruseb has served in the cabinet since 1997 and the National Assembly since 1995.

Early life and education
ǃNaruseb was born on 20 March 1954 in Usakos, Erongo Region. From 1970 to 1975, he attended Martin Luther High School in Okombahe. Thereafter he worked for Rössing Uranium in several positions. He has also studied towards a Bachelor of Laws (L.L.B.) at the University of Namibia.

Political career
ǃNaruseb joined SWAPO in 1975 at the age of 21. The next year he began working as a maintenance planner at the Rössing Uranium Mine in Arandis, which lasted until 1980. In that year, he became industrial relations officer at the Mine, which lasted until independence in 1990. During the run-up to independence the late 1980s, he was the internal SWAPO secretary for economic affairs. Following a stint as head organiser of mass organisations in SWAPO from 1990 to 1991, he joined the SWAPO central committee in that year. From 1992 to 2002, ǃNaruseb was the head of information and publicity in the SWAPO Party. He also was selected to the National Assembly in 1995.

In 1997, ǃNaruseb was appointed deputy Minister of Fisheries and Marine Resources, which lasted until his move to deputy Minister of Justice in 2003. In 2005 he was promoted to Minister of Labour and Social Welfare under the newly elected president Hifikepunye Pohamba. In 2008, !Naruseb was shuffled to the post of Minister of Lands and Resettlement, replacing Jerry Ekandjo. ǃNaruseb expressed frustration at the pace of land reform in Namibia, suggesting that the law be changed to "prioritise the resettlement of the most needy".

Under president Hage Geingob, ǃNaruseb was appointed as Minister of Works and Transport in March 2015. in 2018 he was shuffled to the post of Minister of Agriculture, Water and Forestry. He resigned from his political posts in 2020.

References

1954 births
Living people
People from Erongo Region
Members of the National Assembly (Namibia)
SWAPO politicians
Labour ministers of Namibia
Land reform ministers of Namibia
Works and transport ministers of Namibia
Agriculture ministers of Namibia